Rožnik may refer to several places in Slovenia: 

Rožnik District, a district of Ljubljana
Rožnik, Grosuplje, a settlement in the Municipality of Grosuplje
Rožnik (hill), a hill in Ljubljana